Michael Joseph O'Halloran (20 August 1933 – 29 November 1999) was an Irish-born British politician. He was brought up in County Clare, Ireland, and being out of work, he "drifted to London" in 1948, aged fifteen, and worked as a railwayman until he entered politics.

He stood as a Labour candidate, and was elected as the Member of Parliament for Islington North at a by-election in 1969 following the death of sitting MP Gerry Reynolds. He had previously been the secretary of the Islington North Constituency Labour Party. His selection over Keith Kyle was the subject of an investigation in the early-1970s by The Sunday Times newspaper. They highlighted his background with a local building company and the local Irish community and questioned the propriety of the tactics of his supporters during his selection as candidate. He was a staunch Catholic in his political beliefs, although he made relatively few contributions to parliamentary debates.  He frequently drew on his experience as a railwayman when discussing transport policy.
 
In 1976, Keith  Veness,  a local party member, was expelled for saying that O'Halloran was dominated by Irish Catholic influences, but later reinstated by the party's NEC.

He was a strong opponent of the legalisation of abortion.  His office was invaded by activists in 1977, and he claims that he was punched to the ground and kicked, and was only revived when the police arrived.  During the same year, when the Labour Government's parliamentary majority was under threat, he threatened to resign unless the far-left in his constituency party were brought under control.

Following pressure from the left in his local party, O'Halloran was among the Labour MPs who defected to the newly founded Social Democratic Party (SDP) in 1981. However, in 1983, the SDP chose John Grant, the MP for Islington Central (which was being abolished in boundary changes), to be their official candidate in Islington North. O'Halloran left the SDP to stand as an Independent Labour candidate at the 1983 general election. The official Labour Party candidate and future leader, Jeremy Corbyn won the seat; whilst O'Halloran came in fourth place with 11% of the vote. Grant finished in third place with 22% of the vote.

O'Halloran retired to County Wexford with his wife, and lived there until his death aged 66.

References

 Times Guide to the House of Commons 1983

External links 
 

20th-century Irish people
1933 births
1999 deaths
Labour Party (UK) MPs for English constituencies
National Union of Railwaymen-sponsored MPs
People from Islington (district)
Politicians from County Clare
Politicians from County Wexford
Irish emigrants to the United Kingdom
Social Democratic Party (UK) MPs for English constituencies
UK MPs 1966–1970
UK MPs 1970–1974
UK MPs 1974
UK MPs 1974–1979
UK MPs 1979–1983
Independent members of the House of Commons of the United Kingdom